Cheerleaders Wild Weekend is a 1979 cheerleader comedy film. It was also known as The Great American Girl Robbery.

Roger Ebert derided the film as a "Dog of the Week" in an episode of Sneak Previews in 1979.

References

External links
The Great American Girl Robbery at IMDb

1979 films
1979 comedy films
American comedy films
1970s English-language films
1970s American films